Visioncall was established in 1994 and is a home visiting optician that provides free home eye tests for the elderly and housebound in the United Kingdom. Visioncall also specialise in domiciliary eye care for care homes, hearing screening, and dental care.

Branches 

The Visioncall head office is based in Cambuslang, Scotland. They also have branches in Doncaster, Manchester, Newcastle, Surrey, Bristol, Essex, Birmingham, Wales and Ireland.

Services 

Free Eye Tests 
Domiciliary Eye Care
Hearing Screening
Training for Care Home Staff

Products 

Low Vision Aids
Hearing Accessories
Dementia Signage
Digital Hearing Aids

Awards 

Visioncall has twice been ranked in the Sunday Times Top 100 Fast Track Companies. They ranked number 38 in 2006  and number 71 in 2007 

The owners of Visioncall were named as finalists for the Ernst & Young Scottish Entrepreneur of the Year Awards

References

External links
 Official site

British opticians
Companies based in South Lanarkshire